Kian H. Hansen (born 3 March 1989) is a Danish professional footballer who plays as a centre-back for FC Nordsjælland.

Club career
Hansen has played for Esbjerg the most part of his career, having been promoted to the first team in 2008. Following injury problems for Esbjerg's then captain Nicolai Høgh during the 2012–13 season, Hansen established himself as a regular starter.

He made his Ligue 1 debut for Nantes on 9 August 2014 against RC Lens.

On 19 July 2019, FC Nordsjælland confirmed, that they had signed Hansen.

International career
Hansen's good form for Esbjerg in the spring of 2013 earned him a call up for the Danish National Team for a friendly against Georgia.

Honours
FC Midtjylland
 Danish Cup:  2018–19

References

External links
 
 
 Kian Hansen on FCN's website

1989 births
Living people
Association football defenders
Danish men's footballers
Denmark international footballers
Denmark youth international footballers
Danish expatriate men's footballers
Esbjerg fB players
FC Nantes players
FC Midtjylland players
FC Nordsjælland players
Danish Superliga players
Ligue 1 players
Expatriate footballers in France
Danish expatriate sportspeople in France
People from Billund Municipality
Sportspeople from the Region of Southern Denmark